The Malone Pioneers are athletic teams of Malone University in Canton, Ohio, United States. The Pioneers compete in Division II of the National Collegiate Athletic Association (NCAA) as members of the Great Midwest Athletic Conference (G-MAC). Malone joined the G-MAC after four seasons in the Great Lakes Intercollegiate Athletic Conference (GLIAC) from 2012–13 to 2015–16. Malone joined the GLIAC and Division II in the 2011–12 season (as an independent in its provisional status) and completed the NCAA Division II membership process in July 2013 after having previously competed in the National Association of Intercollegiate Athletics (NAIA); mostly known for its tenure with the now-defunct American Mideast Conference from 1965–66 to 1988–89, and from 1993–94 to 2010–11. In 2016, the Pioneers will begin play in the Great Midwest Athletic Conference, also known as the G-MAC.

Varsity teams

Men's Sports
 Baseball
 Basketball
 Cross Country
 Golf
 Soccer
 Swimming and Diving
 Track & Field (indoor & outdoor)

Women's Sports
 Basketball
 Cross Country
 Golf
 Soccer
 Softball
 Swimming and Diving
 Track & Field (indoor & outdoor)
 Volleyball

National championships

Team

Individual teams

Baseball
A winning tradition was established on the baseball diamond at Malone by late NAIA Hall of Fame Coach Bob Starcher.  Coach Starcher led the Pioneer baseball program for 23 seasons and accumulating 521 wins while at Malone.  During Starcher's tenure as head coach, the program experienced 19 winning seasons and 12 conference or district titles. In 2007, the last baseball game was played on the site of long-time Bob Starcher Field at Malone College.

Football
See List of Malone Pioneers head football coaches
Malone University played football continuously between 1993 and 2018.  The program began under head coach Joe Palmisano with a 23–23 tie against Bethany (WV) on September 4, 1993.  Malone concluded their program with an all-time record of 104 wins, 164 losses, and 2 ties.  The last head football coach was Fred Thomas, who coached from 2016–2018.  He took over the program from Eric Hehman, who held the position from 2009 until 2015.  The school disbanded the team in February 2019.

Conference Titles

Postseason History

Track and field/cross country
There have been a total of 133 Men's NAIA track and field All-Americans and 17 NAIA national champions.  On the woman's side, there have been 59 NAIA All-Americans and two national champions.  Both of these totals include indoor and outdoor track and field.  Keith Spiva is arguably the most accomplished track and field athlete produced by Malone.  He won 4 NAIA national titles and was named an All-American 6 times.  He is also the only Malone track and field athlete to win back-to-back national titles in a single event (1989 and 1990 200 meter dash). Christopher Sinick is the most decorated male athlete, with a total of 11 All-American awards in both cross country and track. Combination of track and field with cross-country accomplishments, there have been 69 additional Men's NAIA All-Americans and 28 Woman's NAIA All-Americans.  Moreover, Malone has produced one Men's and one Woman's individual cross country national champions.

Malone has won the following national honors:
 NAIA
Men's national cross-country champions: 1972,2007,2008 and 2009 
Men's national cross-country runner-up: 1973, 1980, 1989, and 2001
Women's national cross-country champions: 1999
Women's national cross-country runner-up: 1998
NCCAA
Men's national track & field champions: 1973, 1989, 1991, and 2007
Men's national cross-country champions (Division I): 1986–1992, 1994, 1995, 1997–2000, 2002, 2003, 2005, and 2006
Women's national track & field champions: 1987–1989, 1999–2002, 2004, and 2005
Women's national cross-country champions (Division I): 1986, 1987, 1989, 1990, 1992, 1993, 1997–1999, and 2004

Volleyball
Women's Volleyball has been played at Malone since 1975 and has amassed nearly 900 all-time wins.  The current coach Tanya Hockman has been head of the program since 1999 and has held the position longer than any other volleyball coach at Malone.

The Malone volleyball program has been an extremely successful one through the years, particularly in the mid 1980s and now under Hockman, who has led the team to over 450 wins during her tenure.  The 2001 team tied the school record for most wins in a season at 41 and the program also has two AMC titles (2000, 2001) under Hockman.

References

External links